BHC can refer to:
 Balochistan High Court, a high court in Quetta, Balochistan, Pakistan
 Bank holding company,  company with significant ownership of one or more banks
 Barron Hilton Cup, a glider competition
 Beaconhills College, a school in Victoria, Australia
 Beating Heart Cadaver, a human body that, after having been declared brain-dead, is attached to a medical ventilator in order to preserve organs for organ transplantation
 Benign hereditary chorea, a neurological disorder
 Benzene hexachloride (disambiguation), different chemicals
 Bergischer HC, a German team handball club
 British high commission
 Beverly Hills Cop (film series), a movie franchise starring Eddie Murphy
 Beverly Hills Chihuahua
 BHC Communications, a broadcast holding company, held by Chris-Craft Industries
 British Home Championship, an annual football competition in the United Kingdom
 British Honduras Constabulary, a former police force in Belize
 British Hovercraft Corporation, a former hovercraft manufacturer of the United Kingdom
Business History Conference, an organization that focuses on business history and the environment in which businesses operate